Tigranakert or Dikranagerd may refer to Armenian cities founded by Tigranes the Great in 1st century B.C.:
Tigranocerta, an ancient site in historic Armenia (present-day Turkey), served as Armenia's capital
Tigranakert (Nakhijevan) or Tigranavan, located in present-day Nakhchivan Autonomous Republic, Azerbaijan
Tigranakert of Artsakh, an ancient site in Nagorno-Karabakh
Tigranakert (Utik), an ancient site in Gadabay District (a.k.a. Northern Artsakh), present-day Azerbaijan

See also
Battle of Tigranocerta
Tigranes the Great